Bonanza is an unincorporated community in Alberta, Canada.

It is located in census division No. 19 and is administered by Saddle Hills County.

See also 
List of communities in Alberta

References 

Localities in Saddle Hills County